Pau Cunill Clapés (born 4 January 2000) is a Spanish field hockey player who plays as a defender for División de Honor club Atlètic Terrassa and the Spain national team.

Personal life
Pau Cunill has a younger brother, Pepe, who also plays field hockey for Spain.

Club career
In the Spanish División de Honor, Cunill plays for Atlètic Terrassa.

International career

Under–21
Cunill made his debut for the Spain under-21 team in 2021, at the FIH Junior World Cup in Bhubaneswar.

Los Redsticks
In 2022 Cunill made his debut for Los Redsticks in a test match against the Netherlands in Cádiz. He was later named in the national squad for season three of the FIH Pro League. In September 2022 he was nominated for the FIH Rising Star of the Year Award at the 2021–22 FIH Hockey Stars Awards. He made his World Cup debut at the 2023 Men's FIH Hockey World Cup.

Honours
Atlètic Terrassa
 Divisón de Honor: 2021–22
 Copa del Rey: 2021–22

References

External links
 
 

2000 births
Living people
Male field hockey defenders
Spanish male field hockey players
2023 Men's FIH Hockey World Cup players
Atlètic Terrassa players
División de Honor de Hockey Hierba players
Place of birth missing (living people)